Girolamo Alessandro Biaggi (February 2, 1819 – March 21, 1897) was an Italian composer, critic, and teacher of music.

Biography 
Biaggi was a pupil of Nicola Vaccaj and Alessandro Rolla, studying composition and violin at the Conservatorio Luigi Cherubini from 1829 to 1839.

Biaggi founded L'Italia musicale, a weekly magazine published by the publisher Lucca in 1847, which he edited until 1848.  After taking part in the Five Days of Milan, he was appointed a secretary of the provisional government of Milan, after the Salasco armistice, he left Italy for Paris. After his return to Italy in 1860, he contributed to numerous newspapers and magazines including La Nazione and Nova Antologia. He wrote for the Gazette d'Italia under the pen name d'Ippolito d'Albano.

Biaggi espoused on conservative positions as a music critic, and became a professor of musical aesthetics and history of music

Biaggi composed and wrote the verses for two lyrical works, and he wrote a requiem and some chamber arias.

Lyrical works 
 Don Desiderio disperato per eccesso di buon cuore (1839)
 Martino della Scala (1856)

Writings 
 Della musica religiosa e delle questioni inerenti (1856)
 Istradamento pratico alla lettura della musica (1861)

Bibliography 
 Enciclopèdia Espasa Volum núm. 8, pàg. 445
 Theodore Baker and Nicolas Slonimsky Baker's Biographical Dictionary of Musicians, p. 413

External links 
 Girolamo Alessandro Biaggi, in Dizionario biografico degli italiani, Istituto dell'Enciclopedia Italiana

1819 births
1897 deaths
Italian male composers
Italian music educators
19th-century Italian male musicians